Re Londonderry's Settlement [1965] Ch 918 is an English trusts law case concerning the duty of trustees to provide information to beneficiaries. It has been heavily criticised and possibly doubted by Schmidt v Rosewood Trust Ltd.

Facts
A beneficiary did not like the small sums proposed to be distributed to her. She wanted information about the reasons for the decision.

Judgment
The Court of Appeal held that there was no need for disclosure of reasons, because it could cause family strife, fruitless litigation or make the trustees’ role impossible.

See also

Schmidt v Rosewood Trust Ltd [2003] UKPC 26
Hartigan Nominees v Rydge (1992) 29 NSWLR 405, Kirby P said it would not be unduly burdensome for professional trustees to provide reasoned decisions and that would be likely to cause less strife than no reasons at all.
Hawkesley v May [1955] 3 WLR 569, obligation to inform beneficiaries of their status as beneficiaries when they turn 18.
Re Manisty’s Settlement [1971] Ch 17, no necessary duty to inform objects of a power of their status, only the primary objects, who are identifiable only as a question of fact
Murphy v Murphy [1999] 1 WLR 283, a settlor had to provide information to a discretionary beneficiary. A more remote beneficiary may not have gained disclosure.

Notes

References
R Walker, ‘Some Trust Principles in the Pensions Context’ in AJ Oakley (ed) Trends in Contemporary Trust Law (Clarendon, Oxford 1996) 123, 131
Lord Browne-Wilkinson, ‘Equity and its relevance to superannuation today’ (Leo Cussen Institute) cited in Crown v Stevedoring Employees Retirement Fund [2003] VSC 316, [34]
DJ Hayton and C Mitchell, The Law of Trusts and Equitable Remedies (Sweet and Maxwell 2005) 9-295, 677, says that in ‘my firm opinion’ it is undermined by Schmidt v Rosewood Trust Ltd on its own terms in family trusts, also citing agreement from Lord Hoffmann and Lightman J.

English trusts case law
Court of Appeal (England and Wales) cases
1965 in British law
1965 in case law